Bob Haozous is a Chiricahua Apache sculptor from Santa Fe, New Mexico. He is enrolled in the Fort Sill Apache Tribe.

Background
Bob Haozous was born on 1 April 1943 in Los Angeles, California. His parents are Anna Marie Gallegos, a Navajo-Mestiza textile artist, and the late Allan Houser (1914–1994), a famous 20th-century Apache sculptor. As a child, Haozous spent time in Apache, Oklahoma, his tribe's headquarters. His parents both taught at Intermountain Indian School, in Brigham City, Utah.

Education and military service
Haozous studied at Utah State University before enlisting in the US Navy, where he served for four years on board of the  during the Vietnam War. After the war, Haozous attended the California College of Arts and Crafts in Oakland, California, where he earned his BFA degree in sculpture in 1971.

Artwork
Haozous works in a range of media, from drawing, painting, and printmaking to jewelry, but his primary focus is on sculpture, especially monumental public works. He sculpts in steel, stone, wood, and aluminum.

His work is often humorous and extremely politically charged. He creates work about his Apache heritage, the environment–especially climate change–and institutional racism.

Art career
As an emerging artist, Haozous exhibited at the annual SWAIA Santa Fe Indian Market, from 1971 until 1991. He moved on to a world stage and has participated in the Venice Biennale in Venice, Italy, in both 1999 and 2001.

Notable exhibitions
 2018–19: Old Man Looking Backward: Bob Haozous, Wheelwright Museum of the American Indian, Santa Fe, NM
 2006: Relations: Indigenous Dialogue, IAIA Museum of Contemporary Native Arts, with catalogue
2001 Umbilicus, Venice Biennale, Italy
2000 Who Stole the Tee Pee, Curated by Atlatl, George Gustav Heye Center, New York City, New York
1999 Ceremonial, Venice Biennale, Italy
1971–1991 SWAIA Santa Fe Indian Market, New Mexico.

Notable collections
British Museum
Heard Museum, Phoenix, Arizona
Institute of American Indian Arts Museum, Santa Fe, NM
Albuquerque Museum of Art and History, New Mexico
Millicent Rogers Museum, Taos, New Mexico
Museum of Indian Arts and Culture, Santa Fe, NM
National Museum of the American Indian, Washington, DC
Philbrook Museum of Art, Tulsa, Oklahoma
Roswell Museum and Art Center, Roswell, New Mexico
Southwest Museum, Los Angeles, California
Westphalian Museum of Natural History, Munster, Germany
Dresdner Bank Collection, Stuttgart, Germany
Museum der Weltkulturen, Frankfurt am Main, Germany
Norsk Sjøfartsmuseum, Trondheim, Norway
Wheelwright Museum, Santa Fe, New Mexico
Haffenreffer Museum of Anthropology at Brown University, Providence, RI 
Daybreak Star Cultural Center, Seattle, Washington

He has also created public art for the cities of Albuquerque, New Mexico; Philadelphia, Pennsylvania; San Diego, California; Seattle, Washington; and Tulsa, Oklahoma, as well as for the Seattle Seahawks Stadium.

Personal
Bob Haozous lives in Santa Fe, New Mexico. He has three children and four brothers. His brother Philip Haozous is also a respected sculptor.

References

External links
Bob Haozous, official website
Interview with Bob Haozous, by Larry Abbot
"Indian Art as Dialogue: The Tricky Transgressions of Bob Haozous." Dissertation abstract by Traci L. Morris-Carlsten, University of Arizona, 2005
Bob Haozous, Vision Project, by Leanne L.Hirondelle

                   

1943 births
Living people
American people of Mestizo descent
Artists from Santa Fe, New Mexico
California College of the Arts alumni
Chiricahua people
Contemporary sculptors
Mestizo artists
Native American curators
Native American sculptors
United States Navy sailors
Utah State University alumni
Sculptors from New Mexico
20th-century American sculptors
21st-century American sculptors
Fort Sill Apache Tribe